Gocha Tkebuchava (born 24 November 1963) is a Georgian professional football coach and former player. He is an assistant coach with Uzbek club Pakhtakor Tashkent FK.

Club career
He made his professional debut in the Soviet Second League in 1982 for FC Lokomotivi Tbilisi. He played 1 game in the UEFA Cup 1982–83 for FC Dynamo Moscow.

Honours
 Umaglesi Liga 1990 runner-up.

References

1963 births
Footballers from Tbilisi
Living people
Soviet footballers
Association football midfielders
Footballers from Georgia (country)
Georgia (country) international footballers
FC Dynamo Moscow players
FC Dinamo Tbilisi players
Soviet Top League players
Football managers from Georgia (country)
Expatriate footballers from Georgia (country)
Expatriate football managers from Georgia (country)
Expatriate football managers in Uzbekistan
FC Guria Lanchkhuti players
Hapoel Ashdod F.C. players
Hakoah Maccabi Amidar Ramat Gan F.C. players
Hapoel Ashkelon F.C. players
Maccabi Herzliya F.C. players
Beitar Tel Aviv F.C. players
Expatriate footballers in Israel
FC Ilves players
FC Dinamo Tbilisi managers
FC Zugdidi managers
Georgia national football team managers
Liga Leumit players
Veikkausliiga players
Expatriate footballers in Finland
Expatriate sportspeople from Georgia (country) in Israel
Expatriate sportspeople from Georgia (country) in Finland
Expatriate sportspeople from Georgia (country) in Uzbekistan